Uronarti, a Nubian word meaning "Island of the King", is an island in the Nile just south of the Second Cataract in the north of Sudan. The primary importance of the island lies in the massive ancient fortress that still stands on its northern end. This fortress is one of a number constructed along the Nile in Lower Nubia during the Middle Kingdom (19th century BC), primarily by the rulers Senusret I and Senusret III.

Many of the fortresses, which include Buhen, Mirgissa, Shalfak, Askut, Dabenarti, Semna, and Kumma, were established within signaling distance of each other. Most of the fortresses are now beneath Lake Nasser; Uronarti and Shalfak remain above water and both have recently seen the establishment of new archaeological projects.

Excavation history 
Uronarti was first excavated by British archaeologist Noel F. Wheeler under the nominal supervision of George Andrew Reisner. The preliminary examination of the site was in May 1924. The excavations took place between November 15, 1928 – January 16, 1929 and February 5, 1930 – March 20, 1930. The publication of these excavations fell to Dows Dunham.

It was long thought that the fortress was under water; it was recently rediscovered by Derek Welsby. In 2012, the Uronarti Regional Archaeology Project (URAP) was formed by Dr Laurel Bestock (Brown University) and Dr Christian Knoblauch (Austrian Academy of Sciences) to investigate Uronarti. The project, which is ongoing, focuses on colonial relations and the lived experience of ancient people on Uronarti and in the surrounding region. The discoveries of the project include an extramural settlement contemporary with the fortress, called Site FC, and extensive remodeling within the fortress.

The fortress 
The triangular shaped fortress of Uronarti is situated high on a rocky island, where it took advantage of the narrow passage of the Nile River in an area with the modern name Batn-El-Hajar - the Belly of Rocks. Conforming closely to the topography, the fort is largely constructed of sun-dried mud brick, with some stone foundations beneath its outer walls when those are laid on the very steep parts of the island. The outer walls measure 5 meters thick and were originally probably 10 meters high; they were built with an interior lattice of tree trunks, further reinforced and leveled with layers of reed matting. The fortress proper has a length and width of about 120 meters x 60 meters.

The interior of the fortress has streets paved with stone, large granaries, buildings thought to be an administrative center and a governor's house, and barracks. (A digitized plan based on early excavation reports, known to be inaccurate in many regards, can be found at UCLA's aegeron project.) The barracks are similar in plan to small houses known at other Middle Kingdom settlements that were planned by the state, including Lahun. Many of the buildings inside the fortress saw substantial modifications over time, indicating shifts in both social life and administration. The ceramics from dumps at Uronarti suggest an occupation history into the very late Middle Kingdom or very early Second Intermediate Period, but not beyond. A stone temple built at the site, just outside the fortress walls, dates to the reign of the Eighteenth Dynasty king Thutmose III, who controlled a far larger amount of Nubia than his predecessors had and thus established a frontier well to the south. The Uronarti temple was dedicated to Senusret III. No real population at the site is evident at that time.

Aside from the architecture itself, the overwhelming majority of archaeological finds from Uronarti fortress are ceramics. The volume of pottery from the original excavations of the fortress was so high that only complete vessels were ever recorded; dumps from both the initial use of the fortress, which was regularly cleaned out by its inhabitants, and from the Wheeler excavations, cover large parts of the area south of the fortress. Amongst notable ceramic types are bread moulds, typical of many Middle Kingdom sites and indicative of the provisioning of the garrison, and Nubian cooking pots, pointing to interaction with a local population, though there is no contemporary Nubian settlement known from the immediate area.

Inscribed finds at Uronarti include seal impressions, mud stamps, pottery, papyrus fragments, and stelae. Most papyrus fragments include only a few characters; while they are thus largely illegible, they attest to the high level of documentation of the administrative activities of the fortress (see the Semna Despatches for better preserved records of this type of activity). The mud stamps are a type known only from the fortresses; depicting captives, rather than having inscriptions proper, they may have been used as a kind of token. The large number of sealings reflects administrative activities; they were broken off of delivered goods that came in jars and boxes, were from sealed letters, and sealed doors, and are also common at other Nubian fortresses. The seals referring to the various surrounding fortresses in the Second Cataract region show the close connection between them. Centers for local administration are also seen in the treasuries and granaries that are shown to exist in the seals as well. The ties between Egypt as a whole and the fortresses are represented in the seals of the great granary of King Sesostris III. The suggested existence of a dual and shared viziership in Egypt in the Late Middle Kingdom is also seen in a seal found stating “office of the vizier of the Head-of-the South”.

Site FC 
Site FC is an extramural site some 250m south of the walls of the fortress. Discovered in 2012 and partly excavated in 2013 and 2015, it is significantly different from the fort although it appears to be contemporary with it. Occupying two low hills near the current east shore of the island, the site consists of at least 25 concentrations of stones that excavation has shown to be the remains of dry-stone huts constructed of local stone. Some huts were single rooms, some more elaborate groupings of rooms. The rooms range from 2.5 meters to 4 meters in diameter and were circular or semi-circular. Site FC as observed covers an area of approximately 2000 meters^2, but aerial photographs taken in the 1950s suggest that the original site may have extended along the eastern shore of the island in its entirety.

One excavated hut had a hearth in it and a windbreak protecting large storage vessels. The ceramics from both survey and excavation are a domestic assemblage of Egyptian pottery from the Twelfth Dynasty. They are thus contemporary with the early phase of the occupation of the fortress, though they are also poorer than the assemblage found at the fort, lacking some common forms and showing indication of breakage and wear to a greater extent than the fortress pottery. This pottery in combination with the architecture of FC, which is very different than that of the fortress and of a type more usually connected to C-Group Nubian settlements, raises as many questions as it answers.

The "Campaign Palace" 
In addition to the fortress, Uronarti had some other mud brick constructions, the largest of which was a rectangular building that is discussed in scholarly literature as the "Campaign Palace". (An idealized plan based on excavated remains can be found at aegaron.) Excavated in 10 days by Wheeler, its architecture and the associated finds were insufficient to provide conclusive evidence of either its date or function; the idea that it was a place for Senusret III to stay while on campaign against Nubians farther to the south is a colorful but unprovable suggestion. This area of this structure now lies in the area that is annually inundated by the rise in the Nile, and is thus covered either by water or by silt. The URAP conducted magnetometry at low water to try to see if remains of the "palace" were still extant; results were inconclusive.

The Boundary Stela of Senusret III 
A near-duplicate of the text of the Semna stela of Senusret III was found at Uronarti by Georg Steindorff, Ludwig Borchardt and H. Schäfer. The inscription states that the Nubians attacked first and that Senusret forced them to retreat. The stela measures 1.50 meters in height and 0.80 meters in breadth and is of brown sandstone. A discussion, transcription, and translation were published by J. Janssen. The stela, one of the treasures of the National Museum of Sudan, reads:

“Horus: Divine of Forms; the Two Ladies: Divine of Birth; the Golden Horus: He has Come into Being(?); The King of Upper and Lower Egypt: Re is Appearing of Ka’s granted life, stability and wealth like Re eternally; The Son of Re of his (own) Body: Sesostris (III), granted life, stability, and wealth like Re eternally!

(1) Stela made in year 16, third month of winter, when the fortress “Repelling the Iwentiu” [Uronarti] was built.

(2) I have made the boundary going farther southward than my ancestors and I have exceeded

(3) that which was bequeathed to me. I am a king who speaks, (and by it) executes; what my heart plans is done by my hand;

(4) aggressive to conquer; acting resolute with success; in whose heart the world does not sleep,

(5) (but) one thinking of his clients who trust on mildness; not being mild against the enemy who attacks him; attacking

(6) when he is attacked; keeping silence if one is silent (against him); answering a word according to that what has happened in it (i.e., who gives an answer according to the nature of the question). For

(7) to desist after being attacked boldness the heart of the enemy. To be aggressive is to be brave, to retreat is timidity.

(8) Really unvirile is he who is debarred from his frontier, since the Nubian hears

(9) to fall at a word (i.e., the Nubian hardly hears or he falls at the [first] word.); the answering of him causes him to retire. If one is aggressive against him, he turns his back; if one retreats, he falls

(10) into aggression. They are not people one must fear; they are wretches, broken of heart. My Majesty has seen them,

(11) there is no untruth. (For) I have captured their wives, and I have brought back their inhabitants, ascended to their wells

(12) and slain their bulls. I have pulled up their barley and set the flame in it. As my father lives for me;

(13)I speak in truth, without a word of boasting therein issuing from my mouth. Now as for every son of mine

(14) who shall strengthen this boundary which My Majesty (life, prosperity and health); has made, he is my son, [and he is born to]

(15) My Majesty (life, prosperity and health); good is a son, the helper of his father, and who strengthens [the boundary of]

(16) him that begot him. Now as for him who shall lose it and shall not fight [on behalf of it],

(17) he is not my son and he is not born to me. Now [My Majesty (life, prosperity and health) has caused]

(18) the erection of a statue of My Majesty (life, prosperity and health) on this frontier [which My Majesty (life, prosperity and health) made]

(19) in order that you may persevere on it and in order that [you might fight on behalf of it].

References

History of Nubia
Ancient Egypt
Archaeological sites in Sudan
Former populated places in Sudan